Queenton is a suburb of Charters Towers in the Charters Towers Region, Queensland, Australia. In the  Queenton had a population of 1,285 people.

Geography 

The Great Northern railway passes through Queenton from the north-east to the south-west with Charters Towers railway station within the locality.  The railway line forms both part of the locality's north-eastern boundary and also part of its western boundary. The Flinders Highway forms a part of the locality's eastern boundary.

The land is predominantly flat (approximately 300 metres above sea level), partly residential, partly old mine ruins, and partly undeveloped bushland.

History 

Queenton State School opened on 13 July 1891 and closed on 1 September 1931.

In the 2011 census, Queenton had a population of 1,702 people.

On 3 August 2012 a part of Queenton was excised and made part of the new suburb of Charters Towers City.

In the  Queenton had a population of 1,285 people.

Heritage listings 

Queenton has a number of heritage-listed sites, including:
 Enterprise Road: Signals, Crane and Subway, Charters Towers Railway Station
 Charters Towers mine shafts
 Stone kerbing, channels and footbridges of Charters Towers

Education
There are no schools in Queenton. The nearest government primary schools are Millchester State School in neighbouring Millchester to the south, Charters Tower Central State School in neighbouring Charters Towers City to the west, and Richmond Hill State School in neighbouring Richmond Hill to the north. The nearest government secondary school is Charters Towers State High School in Charters Towers City.

References

External links 

 

Suburbs of Charters Towers